You and Me is a 1938 American crime film noir directed by Fritz Lang and starring Sylvia Sidney and George Raft. They play a pair of criminals on parole and working in a department store full of similar cases; Harry Carey's character routinely hires ex-convicts to staff his store.  The film was written by Norman Krasna and Virginia Van Upp.

Plot
Mr. Morris, owner of a large department store, hires offenders released on parole to give them a chance to rehabilitate. The other staff do not know.

Among them is Joe Dennis, who is resigning and leaving for California in order to end his growing friendship with fellow-employee Helen Roberts, as he feels unworthy of her. With his violent past, he does not feel he could marry such a sweet and innocent girl. They spend a last evening together and, as he boards the Greyhound bus, she says that if he did ask to marry her the answer would be yes.

They rush to an instant marriage bureau and then back to her room. The landlady emerges to throw Joe out, but relents when Helen shows her ring. Helen says they must keep the wedding secret, because Mr Morris does not approve of employees marrying each other. In fact he does not mind, but Helen is not allowed to marry while on parole.

When Joe finds a ribboned bundle of what he assumes are love letters in Helen's room, but which are parole cards, he becomes jealous of her past, and meets up for a drink with some criminals from his own. They plan to rob Morris' store at night, and recruit him to join the operation. But one of the gang is sorry for Helen, should Joe end up back in prison, and, trying to disguise his voice on the telephone, encourages her to keep him away that night; but panicking, he fails to cover the telephone properly; she recognizes the voice, deduces why, and warns Morris.

When the robbers break into the store, they are surrounded by armed guards. Morris says he will let them go once they have listened to what Helen has to say. With considerable expertise, she outlines on a blackboard the full costs of the operation they had planned and the meager returns each individual would receive if it had succeeded. Joe is not amused by Helen's role in the affair or by her sophisticated knowledge of heist planning. As he does not offer any reconciliation, she packs her things and disappears.

Joe and his colleagues search all over town, with no leads. From Helen's parole officer, Joe learns that Helen is pregnant and that her marriage was void as it breached her parole conditions. After looking everywhere for her, one of the gang realizes that she'd probably be in a hospital, and finds her. The film ends with their second, but this time valid, marriage.

Cast
 Sylvia Sidney as Helen 
 George Raft as Joe Dennis
 Barton MacLane as Mickey 
 Harry Carey as Mr. Morris
 Roscoe Karns as Cuffy 
 George E. Stone as Patsy
 Warren Hymer as Gimpy
 Robert Cummings as Jim
 Adrian Morris as Knucks 
 Roger Gray as Bath House 
 Cecil Cunningham as Mrs. Morris
 Vera Gordon as Mrs. Levine
 Egon Brecher as Mr. Levine
 Willard Robertson as Dayton
 Guinn Williams as Text 
 Bernadene Hayes as Nellie
 Joyce Compton as Curly Blonde 
 Carol Paige as Torch Singer

Production
William LeBaron of Paramount asked Norman Krasna if he could come up with a vehicle for George Raft. Krasna agreed provided he was allowed to direct. Then Carole Lombard read the script and wanted to be involved; Krasna says Paramount did not want first-time director Krasna to be entrusted with a Lombard-Raft film and tried to force Krasna off the project. In 1936, it was reported the film would be delayed because Raft did not want Krasna to direct. There was some talk John Howard might replace Raft. Arline Judge was going to star alongside Lombard. Raft was put on suspension and $24,000 of his salary was withheld. However the film did not go ahead.

Then several months later B.P. Schulberg, who was producing films for Paramount, decided to re-activate the project. He replaced Lombard with Sylvia Sidney and the male lead went to John Trent. Richard Wallace was meant to direct.

Eventually Raft – who had made a film with Sidney, The Pick Up (1933) – did the film. By May 1937, Schulberg was no longer producer and the director was Fritz Lang who had just made Fury and You Only Live Once with Sidney.

Lang used a musical score from Kurt Weill, who "had nothing to do just then." They worked together and Weill composed introductory music for certain scenes. According to Lang, Weill left him "in the lurch" and left the project before the music was finished, and the score was completed by Boris Morros, head of Paramount's music department.

Lang says he was influenced by Bertolt Brecht, who had developed a style of theatre called Lehrstucke, theatre that teaches. "I wanted to make a didactic picture teaching the audience that crime doesn't pay", said Lang. "Which is a lie, because crime pays very well. The message was spelled out at the end by Sylvia Sidney on a blackboard to a classroom of crooks." Lang later said the scene where prisoners were nostalgic for prison was "stupid".

Production credits
 Fritz Lang - director
 Virginia Van Upp - screenplay
 Norman Krasna - story
 Charles Lang - photography
 Hans Dreier - art direction
 Ernst Fegté - art direction
 Paul Weatherwax - editor
 Harry Lindgren - sound recording
 Walter Oberst - sound recording
 A. E. Freudeman - interior decorations
 Boris Morros - musical direction
 Kurt Weill - music
 Sam Coslow - lyrics
 Phil Boutelje - musical adviser

Songs
"Song of the Cash Register"
"Knocking Song"
"The Right Guy for Me"
"Romance of a Lifetime"
"The Song of the Lie"
"We're the Kind of People Who Sing Lullabies"

Reception

Box office
The film was a box office flop. "It was – I think deservedly – my first real flop", said Lang.

Critical
Jonathan Rosenbaum described You and Me as "among Lang's most unjustly neglected Hollywood pictures – not an unqualified success by any means but interesting, imaginative, and genuinely strange."

Lang later called it a "lousy picture".

Filmink said "it flopped and Raft may as well have done it with Krasna."

References

External links
 
 
 

1938 films
Film noir
American black-and-white films
Films directed by Fritz Lang
Films set in department stores
Paramount Pictures films
1938 crime films
American crime films
1930s English-language films
1930s American films
English-language crime films